Tyne-James Organ is an Australian singer-songwriter from Wollongong, New South Wales, residing in Melbourne, Australia.
 
He released his debut studio album, Necessary Evil on 21 May 2021.

Early life
Tyne-James' father is Rikki Organ, who died in 2016.

Organ built an online support base uploading cover versions of songs on YouTube. Organ supported The Vanns in 2014. and Allday and UV Boi in 2016.

Career

2016–2019: Debut EP
In 2016, Organ released his debut single "In My Arms".

In 2017, Organ signed with Dew Process and released the single "Watch You Go" which Hayden Davis from Pile Rats described as "a beautifully stripped-back ballad which will leave your heart aching with its personal message." The song was dedicated to his father, Rikki, who died from cancer in 2016.

In September 2019, Organ released his debut EP,

2020–present: Necessary Evil
In May 2020, Organ released "Hold Me Back", the lead single from his debut studio album. The song, which was described by Australian Independent Record Labels Association as a "raw and formidable rock track" was inspired by the Me Too movement and his own interactions with misogyny in a night clubs of Melbourne. Organ said "On a night out with friends, I witnessed a confronting and horrible incident of harassment against one of the female friends I was with. Seeing my friend be assaulted like that and seeing how it affected her really shocked me. We confronted the perpetrator and got him barred from the club. But knowing that so many women go through this experience, I just couldn't shake the sense of anger within me, and this song was written shortly after that awful night." Proceeds from sales/streams went towards the White Ribbon Foundation.

In March 2021, Organ announced the release of his debut album, Necessary Evil, alongside the single "Sunday Suit". The album was created in 2020 with frequent collaborator Chris Collins in Collin's NSW hinterland studio, Stokers Siding Necessary Evil was released on 22 May 2021.

Discography

Studio albums

Extended plays

Singles

Other certified songs

Awards and nominations

ARIA Music Awards
The ARIA Music Awards is an annual ceremony presented by Australian Recording Industry Association (ARIA), which recognise excellence, innovation, and achievement across all genres of the music of Australia. They commenced in 1987.

! 
|-
| 2021  
| Chris Collins for Necessary Evil by Tyne-James Organ
| Engineer of the Year 
| 
|

References

 

21st-century Australian singers
21st-century Australian male singers
Living people
Dew Process artists
Year of birth missing (living people)